Pascoe is a Cornish given name and surname. 

Pascoe may also refer to:

Places
Pascoe Vale, Victoria, suburb in Melbourne, Victoria, Australia
Pascoe Vale South, Victoria, suburb in Melbourne, Victoria, Australia

Other
Pascoe Vale Girls' College, public girls' high school located in Pascoe Vale, Victoria, Australia
Pascoe Vale SC, soccer club located In Melbourne's North-West in Victoria, Australia
Pascoe Vale Football Club, Australian rules football club 
James Pascoe Group, a New Zealand-based retail group named after the founder of Pascoes the Jewellers